The Bigelow Cholla Garden Wilderness is in the eastern Mojave Desert and within Mojave Trails National Monument, located in San Bernardino County, California.

Geography

Flora and fauna
In the wilderness area the vegetation types are predominantly of the creosote bush scrub plant community.  The densest concentration of Bigelow cholla (Cylindropuntia bigelovii) in all California's deserts is found within the wilderness area and the surrounding terrain.

Wildlife is typical for the Mojave Desert; including coyote, black-tailed jackrabbit, ground squirrel, kangaroo rat, quail, roadrunner, rattlesnakes, and several species of lizards.  The area provides habitat for migrating desert bighorn sheep. The western half of the wilderness area provides critical habitat for the threatened desert tortoise.

References

 Part of this article incorporates text from the Bureau of Land Management, which is in the Public domain.

External links
 
 
 
 

Wilderness areas of California
Wilderness areas within the Lower Colorado River Valley
Mojave Trails National Monument
Protected areas of the Mojave Desert
Protected areas of San Bernardino County, California
Bureau of Land Management areas in California
Cylindropuntia